The FIBA 3x3 U18 World Cup is an under-18 basketball tournament run by the International Basketball Federation (FIBA) since 2011. The tournament was known as the FIBA 3x3 U18 World Championships until the 2016 edition.

History
The event was held for the first time in Rimini, Italy, in September 2011 and has been held annually since then.

The tournament was not held in 2014 and 2018 due to 3x3 basketball being an event at the 2014 Summer Youth Olympics and 2018 Summer Youth Olympics. In 2020, it was not held due to COVID-19 pandemic.

Results

Men's tournament

Women's tournament

Statistics

Medal table

Participating teams

Men's teams

Women's teams

Individual contests

Dunk contest

Source: FIBA

Shoot-out 

Source: FIBA

See also
 FIBA 3x3 World Cup

References

External links
 Official website
 2011 tournament official website (Archived)
 2012 tournament official website (Archived)
 2013 tournament official website (Archived)
 2015 tournament official website
 2016 tournament official website
 2017 tournament official website
 2019 tournament official website
 2021 tournament official website

 
Under
Under-18 basketball competitions between national teams
Youth 3x3 basketball
3x3 basketball competitions
World youth sports competitions
Recurring sporting events established in 2011
World championships in basketball